Ticketleap is an online ticket sales and event marketing company based in Pittsburgh, Pennsylvania, in the United States. Founded in 2003 by Wharton graduate Christopher Stanchak, Ticketleap differentiates itself from large ticket vendors by catering its e-ticketing services to small companies and events, as well as larger events. The company started out as just Chris and his mother Connie as the first employee, but has since expanded across the United States, and now Canada, Australia, France, Germany, Ireland, Italy, Mexico, New Zealand, Spain and the United Kingdom. CEO, Chris Stanchak, was nominated as a finalist for the 2011 Greater Philadelphia Region Ernst & Young Entrepreneur of The Year Award in May, 2011.

Features
On August 2, 2010, Ticketleap launched a new platform, integrated into the social media sites Facebook and Twitter

On January 10, 2011 the company announced an Android ticket scanning application, allowing event organizers to scan tickets for Ticketleap events with an Android phone and ensure that all tickets are authentic.

On May 13, 2011 Ticketleap launched Ticketleap Box Office Ticket Sales, allowing event organizers to sell tickets anywhere there is an Internet connection, such as selling tickets at the door.  The product keeps online and onsite sales all in one system.

On April 30, 2012 Ticketleap released a "self-service seating" feature, an industry first. This feature enables event organizers to build and control custom seating for event attendees and allows event goers to choose their own seats at a specific price point.

On June 25, 2012, Ticketleap ditched the frog and rebranded themselves.

See also 
 Mobile ticketing
 Ticket system
 E-mail ticketing system

References

External links 
 Corporate website

Companies based in Philadelphia
Ticket sales companies